The Honourable William Henry Cross (22 August 1856 – 11 December 1892), was a British Conservative politician.

Cross was the eldest son of R. A. Cross, 1st Viscount Cross, by Georgiana, daughter of Thomas Lyon, DL, of Appleton Hall, Cheshire. He was returned to parliament for Liverpool West Derby in 1888, a seat he held until his premature death four years later.

Cross married Mary, daughter of William Lewthwaite, of Broadgate, Cumberland, in 1880. They had one son and four daughters. He died in December 1892, aged 36, predeceasing his father by 22 years. His only son Richard Assheton Cross succeeded in the viscountcy in 1914. Mary Cross survived her husband by over fifty years and died in November 1946.

References

External links

1856 births
1892 deaths
Heirs apparent who never acceded
Conservative Party (UK) MPs for English constituencies
UK MPs 1886–1892